Sumaithaangi is a 1962 Indian Tamil-language drama film, written and directed by C. V. Sridhar. The film stars Gemini Ganesan, Devika and R. Muthuraman. Based on Ra. Ki. Rangarajan's novel of the same name that was serialised in Kumudam, it revolves around a man who could not lead his life the way he wanted, and gets forced to undergo many sacrifices. The film, produced by Kovai Chezhiyan, was released on 7 December 1962. Ganesan won the Film Fans Association Award for Best Actor

Plot 

The movie starts with a typical middle-class family supported by Muthuraman, as he goes to each member comprising retired father Sarangapani, younger brother Gemini Ganesan (GG) and younger sister L. Vijayalakshmi, giving their monthly quota.

GG is a collegian, who is challenged by his friends, Nagesh and others to try his youthful exuberance against Devika, their former school teacher, V. S. Raghavan's only daughter. He accepts the challenge and enters their household as a student trying to learn English literature. As days pass by, GG successfully makes Devika fall in love with him.

Muthuraman is the lead member and the family thrives purely on his earnings. One day, a dejected Muthuraman informs everyone that he has lost his job. His sick company is wound up. Consequently, the family is left with the bare minimum. Pressure mounts on GG to leave his college and take up a job. GG gets a job for Rs. 150. Gemini happily owns the family's responsibility. Meanwhile, L. Vijayalakshmi is in love with GG's friend and has to get married. It so happens that while walking on the beach, GG identifies a purse, which belongs to a retired judge. He hands it over to the retired judge, who soon visits GG's house, meets Sarangapani, mentions GG's noble deed and expresses his desire to offer his daughter in marriage to GG. He also promises a decent job for Muthuraman and also Rs. 20,000 as additional sum to support the family. The judge's daughter is Indira Devi, a friend of Devika and a chronic fits patient. This nervous weakness of his daughter was duly conveyed to Sarangapani, but he decides not to inform GG in the larger interests of the family. The enduring double benefit makes Sarangapani conceal the shortcoming.

Meanwhile, V. S. Raghavan aware of the love, meets Sarangapani and proposes for Devika, but Sarangapani rejects it outright, saying that this alliance will do no good to both the families. GG reluctantly had to yield out of family pressure and decides to sacrifice his love. Devika is shocked by this development and so is V. S. Raghavan. L. Vijayalakshmi happily marries her lover.

However, on the wedding day, Indira Devi realises the love between GG and Devika. She gets nervous weakness followed by fits and falls unconscious. Gemini is shell-shocked and the marriage is cancelled as the judge feels it as inauspicious.

L. Vijayalakshmi's husband gets a good job but has to give a deposit of Rs. 1000. At this moment, GG gets a bonus money, which he is forced to give it to his sister, L. Vijayalakshmi for her husband to get the job secured. So, the sacrifice continues.

Balaji, a good friend of Nagesh and V. S. Raghavan's relative enters now. He is foreign returned and has his own flourishing business. He meets V. S. Raghavan and Devika. Raghavan is very much impressed by Balaji and even proposes Devika to him. Balaji is extremely happy with this and accepts.

One day, Nagesh and Balaji come across GG in a vague disturbed mood. Nagesh explains his background to Balaji and his continuing sacrifices. Balaji, who is pitied by GG's plight offers to give a job, which Nagesh conveys to GG. Muthuraman overhears this conversation. Muthu insists that GG pass that offer to him so that he will resume his role as a lead member and adds that this may enable GG to get back to his studies. Another sacrifice one had to make it here and GG requests Balaji to exercise the option to his brother.

Now, GG thinks about restoring his love life with Devika. He expresses his renewed love, but Raghavan is not happy. Devika too regrets about her love life and advises GG to forget the past. Raghavan tells GG that he has already fixed an alliance for his daughter with a rich man and requests GG not to spoil this prospect. A dejected GG walks away.

A frustrated GG, having lost interest in life, feels there is no purpose in life, resigns his job and comes home. Muthuraman hears this news and rushes home. He sees GG about to have his dinner. He screams at GG for having resigned suddenly and adds a strong remark "It's a curse, somebody in our family is always jobless. I don't know how long someone of us will have to eat free food always." This comment hurts GG so deeply that he immediately walks out of the house and through his friend's request, he lives in an isolated place. Despite repeated requests from Muthuraman, Vijayalakshmi and others, GG refuses to come back. He looks for solace and peace of mind.

As Devika's wedding with Balaji is nearing, Vijayalakshmi pleads with Devika to reconsider her past love and requests her to marry GG. Devika expresses to Balaji about her past love. Balaji gracefully agrees to her request and cancels the marriage. But GG is unaware of all these developments and as days pass by, his bitter past and continuous sufferings haunt him so badly that he writes a lengthy letter to Muthuraman on what made him to reach such an isolated mood now. He wishes the family all the best and ends with a note that he is moving away from everyone to seek his final path in life. Muthuraman tracks the destination of GG through the cover of the letter which shows the seal of Kodaikanal postal department. A stunned Muthuraman, sensing disaster, rushes to V. S. Raghavan and pleads him to reconsider marrying Devika with GG. Raghavan agrees finally and all the three rush to Kodaikanal. Desperate in search, V. S. Raghavan, Devika and Muthuraman all rush to meet GG, only to witness the inevitable.

Unable to withstand continuing challenges, sacrifices and compromises in life, GG finally converts to Christianity and becomes a cleric. Dressed in conventional Christian priest attire, GG stops for a moment and slowly walks past a stunned Devika/Muthuraman/V. S. Raghavan chanting sacred quotes from the Bible.

Cast 
Gemini Ganesan as Babu
Devika as Radha
R. Muthuraman
L. Vijayalakshmi
Nagesh
Raja
Leelavathi
K. Sarangapani
V. S. Raghavan as Rathnavel
K. Balaji
S. A. Natarajan
K. R. Indira Devi
G. Sakunthala

Production 
Sumaithaangi is based on Ra. Ki. Rangarajan's novel of the same name that was serialised in Kumudam. Mid-way through production it was retitled Aayiram Vaasal Idhayam, but this was reversed. The song "Manithan Enbavan" was shot at Marina Beach.

Soundtrack 

The music was composed by Viswanathan–Ramamoorthy, with lyrics by Kannadasan.

Release and reception 
Sumaithaangi was released on 7 December 1962. Kanthan of Kalki positively reviewed the film for the cast performances, particularly Devika. Ganesan won the Film Fans Association Award for Best Actor.

References

External links 
 

1960s Tamil-language films
1962 drama films
1962 films
Films based on Indian novels
Films directed by C. V. Sridhar
Films scored by Viswanathan–Ramamoorthy
Films with screenplays by C. V. Sridhar
Indian drama films